The men's 5000 metres event at the 1998 Commonwealth Games was held 18–19 September on National Stadium, Bukit Jalil.

Medalists

Results

Heats
Qualification: First 5 of each heat (Q) and the next 5 fastest (q) qualified for the semifinals.

Final

References

5000
1998